The Quest for Freedom is a 1992 historical film about abolitionist Harriet Tubman.

Plot
Ben, a rebellious young African American, mysteriously becomes trapped in the past with abolitionist Harriet Tubman. He experiences life with Tubman as a slave on a Maryland plantation. When the master of the plantation dies, Ben and Harriet use the Underground Railroad to gain their freedom and escape Pennsylvania. Ben discovers purpose and courage in his own life upon returning to his own time.

See also
 A Woman Called Moses, 1978 miniseries about Harriet Tubman
 Harriet, 2019 film about Tubman
 List of films featuring slavery

References

External links

1992 films
1992 short films
African-American films
American short films
Films about slavery
Cultural depictions of Harriet Tubman
American historical films
Films about time travel
1990s historical films
Works about the Underground Railroad
1990s English-language films
Films directed by Fred Holmes
1990s American films